WENR is an AM radio station licensed to Englewood, Tennessee, which programs a Classic Rock format. The station broadcasts on AM frequency 1090 kHz at a power of 1,000 watts and is owned by Michael R. Beverly. Because WENR shares the same frequency as former class I-B "clear-channel" stations KAAY in Little Rock, Arkansas and WBAL in Baltimore, Maryland, it broadcasts only during daylight hours and is required to sign off at sunset each night.

The station also simulcasts at 104.9 FM 24 hours a day.

WENR is an affiliate of the weekly syndicated Pink Floyd program "Floydian Slip."

History of call letters
The call letters WENR were previously assigned to an AM station later known as WLS in Chicago, Illinois.

References

External links

Gospel radio stations in the United States
ENR
ENR